Dum is a 2016 Indian Malayalam-language film, written and directed by Anuram. The film stars Shine Tom Chacko, Lal, Joju George, Shritha Sivadas, Parvathi T, and Sreejith Ravi. Thiruvananthapuram and Kochi were the major locations of the film. The film released on 26 August 2016.

Summary

Dum is story of goon named Xavier and his henchman Antony and the struggle they face to achieve their goals.

Cast

Shine Tom Chacko as Antony
Lal as Xavier
Shritha Sivadas as Sherin Xavier
Parvathi T as Annamma
Juby Ninan  as Duttan
Minon as Tommy
Sreejith Ravi as I.G Padma Raj
Joju George as D.C.P Manoj Namboothiri
Kochu Preman as Raghavan
Padmaraj Ratheesh as S.I Kishor
Sudhi Koppa as Chengalchoola Rangan
Bineesh Bastin as Njandu
Sasi Kalinga as Chandran
Kulappulli Leela
Nelson Shooranad as Freek Ravi

Music

The film's songs and background music has been composed by Jassie Gift for the lyrics of Vayalar Sarath Chandra Varma, while the singers are Vineeth Sreenivasan, Lal, Nelson Shooranadu, and Jassie Gift himself.

Reception
Kevin Kishore of Deccan Chronicle rated 2 out of 5 stars. He criticised the script but gave positive nod to Lal's acting.

References

External links
 

2016 films
2010s Malayalam-language films
Indian action drama films
2016 action drama films